Matilde Charro (born 14 March 1953) is a Cuban basketball player. She competed in the women's tournament at the 1980 Summer Olympics.

References

1953 births
Living people
Cuban women's basketball players
Olympic basketball players of Cuba
Basketball players at the 1980 Summer Olympics
Basketball players from Havana